Vytenis is a Lithuanian masculine given name. People with the name Vytenis include:

Vytenis (1260–1316), Grand Duke of Lithuania from c.1295 to c.1316
Vytenis Andriukaitis (born 1951), Lithuanian European Commissioner, heart surgeon, and co-signatory to the 1990 Act of the Re-Establishment of the State of Lithuania
Vytenis Čižauskas (born 1992), Lithuanian basketball player
Vytenis Jankūnas (born 1961), Lithuanian-born American artist 
Vytenis Jasikevičius (born 1985), Lithuanian basketball player
Vytenis Lipkevičius (born 1989), Lithuanian basketball player
Vytenis Rimkus (born 1930), Lithuanian painter and encyclopedist

References

Lithuanian masculine given names